Arshad Hussain (born 3 March 1967) is a retired boxer from Pakistan. He competed at the 1992 Summer Olympics, and the 1994 Commonwealth Games, where he won a bronze medal for boxing in the Men's Lightweight class.

References

External links
 
 

1967 births
Living people
Pakistani male boxers
Lightweight boxers
Olympic boxers of Pakistan
Boxers at the 1992 Summer Olympics
Commonwealth Games bronze medallists for Pakistan
Commonwealth Games medallists in boxing
Boxers at the 1994 Commonwealth Games
Boxers at the 1994 Asian Games
Asian Games competitors for Pakistan
20th-century Pakistani people
Medallists at the 1994 Commonwealth Games